Jaredite kings are a series of monarchs described in the Book of Mormon, comprising chapters 6:22-15 of the Book of Ether. As death was approaching Jared and his brother, gathered together the Jaredite people to ask them what they desired of them before they died. The people then requested that they anoint one of their sons as king. This was grievous to them, and the brother of Jared remarked that "surely this thing leadeth into captivity." Despite his brother's misgivings, Jared pressed him to allow the establishment of a Jaredite kingship at which suggestion the brother of Jared yielded.

The people chose Pagag, the firstborn of the brother of Jared. He refused. The people then wished to force him to be king but the brother of Jared would not allow that. They suggested his sons, Jacom, Gilgah, and Mahah, but they refused to be king. Then, Orihah, the fourth son, agreed to be king. Thus began the institution of monarchy among the Jaredites sometime after the Tower of Babel and the arrival of the Jaredites in the Americas.

Early kings 
 Orihah - son of Jared, righteous king 
 Kib - son of Orihah, righteous king               
 Corihor - son of Kib, unrighteous king, usurped kingship from Kib 
 Shule - son of Kib, overthrew kingship from Corihor and restored it to Kib, and then Kib bestowed kingdom on Shule

Divided kingdom 

Kingdom of Noah/Cohor 
 Noah - son of Corihor, unrighteous king, battled Shule and obtained part of the kingdom including the land of first inheritance and Moron, slain by the sons of Shule 
 Cohor - son of Noah, unrighteous king, slain by Shule 
 Nimrod - son of Cohor, restored the monarchy to Shule 

Kingdom of Shule 
 Shule - son of Kib, righteous king

Reunited kingdom 
 Shule - son of Kib, righteous 
 Omer - son of Shule, righteous, fled with house from Akish 

 Jared - son of Omer, unrighteous, usurped father then usurped by two brothers Esrom and Coriantumr 
 Akish - friend of Omer, married the daughter of Jared, helped Jared regain the throne then usurped and killed Jared 
 Omer - restored to the throne after the civil war of Akish had almost destroyed the entire kingdom
 Emer - son of Omer, righteous, saw Jesus Christ 
 Coriantum - son of Emer, righteous 
 Com - son of Coriantum, righteous 
 Heth - son of Com, unrighteous, slew his father, great destruction in the kingdom, many move to area of Zarahemla                                                                      
 Shez - descendant of Heth, righteous, rebuilt kingdom 
 Riplakish - son of Shez, unrighteous, civil war overthrows Jaredite kingship. There was then a break in continuity of the kingdom because Riplakish was deposed and the government deferred to "the people" which after some generations a king and the kingdom was reestablished by Morianton
 Morianton - descendant of Riplakish, good king but morally weak, restores kingship among Jaredites 
 Kim - son of Morianton, unrighteous  
 Brother of Kim - usurped Kim, unrighteous 
 Levi - son of Kim, usurped the kingdom, righteous 
 Corom - son of Levi, righteous 
 Kish - son of Corom, righteous 
 Lib - son of Kish, righteous 
 Hearthom - son of Lib, righteous

Rule of usurper kings 
 Usurper kings (unknown number) 
 Amgid - unrighteous

Kings in captivity under the usurpers 
 Heth - son of Hearthom 
 Aaron - son of Heth 
 Amnigaddah - son of Aaron 
 Coriantum - son of Amnigaddah

Restoration of rightful lineage 
 Com -son of Coriantum, righteous 
 Shiblom - son of Com, righteous, fought with brother who slew the prophets, great destruction in the land 
 Seth - son of Shiblom, unknown disposition, in captivity after his father was slain 
 Ahah - son of Seth, unrighteous,
 Ethem - descendant of Ahah, unrighteous 
 Moron - son of Ethem, unrighteous, usurped by a wicked "mighty man," then regained throne only to lose it again

Final usurpers of rightful lineage 
 Descendant of the brother of Jared - usurper who was a "mighty man" of unknown connection to Moron 
 Coriantumr - unknown familial lineage, last king of the Jaredites

Continuation of rightful lineage in captivity or outcast
 Moron lost kingdom and placed in captivity 
 Coriantor - son of Moron, lived entire life in captivity
 Ether - son of Coriantor, final prophet, lived apart from the population

Civil war under the reign of Coriantumr 
 Shared - unknown familial lineage, unrighteous at war with Coriantumr, killed by Coriantumr 
 Gilead - brother of Shared, unrighteous, battled Coriantumr and usurped the throne  
 Gilead’s High Priest - unrighteous, murdered Gilead as he sat upon his throne 
 Lib - unrighteous, member of one of the secret combinations, murdered Gilead’s high priest in a secret pass, usurped the throne, killed by Coriantumr 
 Shiz - brother of Lib, unrighteous, waged total war on the people of Coriantumr leading to the end of Jaredite civilization, killed by Coriantumr

References

External links 
 Ether 7-15 
 Jaredite kings lineage chart
 Encyclopedia of Mormonism article on "Jaredites"

Book of Mormon people